Blue Saxophone is an album by saxophonist Teddy Edwards recorded in 1992 and released on the French Verve/Gitanes label.

Reception 

In his review for AllMusic, Scott Yanow stated "Teddy Edwards has not led enough sessions throughout his career considering his great talent. In the 1990s, he has been making up for some of the lost time by putting a great deal of planning into his releases. ... It's an impressive effort".

Track listing 
All compositions by Teddy Edwards except where noted
 "Prelude" – 2:18
 "Blue Saxophone" – 5:23
 "Lennox Lady" – 7:28
 "No Name Number One" – 6:33
 "Ballad for Susan" – 5:09
 "Brazilian Skies" – 4:25
 "Hot Tamale Joe" – 3:16
 "Them Dirty Old Blues" – 7:30
 "Glass of Water" (Leroy Vinnegar) – 7:58
 "Serenade in Blue" (Harry Warren, Mack Gordon) – 6:15
 "Hymn for the Homeless" – 4:05
 "Going Home" – 6:27

Personnel 
Teddy Edwards – tenor saxophone, clarinet, vocals, arranger
Oscar Brashear, James Smith, Frank Szabo – trumpet
Thurman Green, Maurice Spears – trombone
Brenton Banks, Mark Cargill, Michael White – violin
Dan Weinstein – viola
Melissa "Missy" Hasin – cello
Carol Robbins – harp
Art Hillery – piano
Andy Simpkins – bass
Mel Brown – drums
Ray Armando – percussion
Lisa Nobumoto – vocals (tracks 2, 6 & 7)

References 

1993 albums
Teddy Edwards albums
Verve Records albums